Samena Capital is an Asia, India and MENA-focused alternative investments group, co-established in 2008 by Shirish Saraf and key partners from a cross section of industries and regions. This name was chosen due to the markets that Samena invests in. These are the Indian Subcontinent, Asia, Middle East and North Africa – a region collectively known as SAMENA. Also in ancient Buddhist script, Samena means "together" or "collective", which reflects the collective investment model the company is based on. The company and its subsidiaries employ 26 people in 3 locations (London, Dubai and Hong Kong) worldwide, and has 48 shareholders.

In 2014, Samena Capital completed three landmark investment deals. In April 2013, Samena Capital closed its first private equity investment, acquiring Alliance Global Logistics Pte Ltd, a Singapore based third party logistics company. The plan is to use AGL as a platform for a roll up of logistics players across ASEAN to build an integrated regional logistics company. In February 2014, India’s Mahindra Two Wheelers (part of the US$16.7 billion Mahindra Group) and Kinetic Engineering (KEL) announced that KEL has sold its entire equity stake in Mahindra Two Wheelers Limited to Samena Capital.
A leading player in the Indian two wheeler market, Mahindra Two Wheelers Limited has had considerable success with its new age commuter motorbike Centuro, developed based on keen consumer insights.
In June 2014, Samena Capital completed a deal to acquire more than 30% of Ras Al Khaimah Ceramics, the world’s largest producer of ceramic tiles, from the ruler of Ras Al Khaimah, Sheikh Saud bin Saqr Al Qasimi.
The acquisition was made through Samena Capital’s subsidiary, Samena Limestone Holdings, and its consortium of international investors including two Gulf sovereign wealth funds. Under the deal, Samena Capital will be represented on the board of RAK Ceramics, and the two companies will work together to use private equity strategies to unlock new growth opportunities.

Business model and structure
Samena Capital brings together entrepreneurs, business leaders and dealmakers from different industries across the SAMENA region, who collectively form the shareholders and the investment team.
 
The company uses these partnerships to obtain deals and to get insights into local markets and networks in the SAMENA region, where relationships often play an important role because the markets tend to be opaque. The shareholders are involved in the running of the business, meeting quarterly to exchange investment ideas, share views on business and explore possibilities of increasing economic trade between their respective markets.

Samena Capital owns three regulated investment advisory subsidiaries, the first in Hong Kong that is licensed by the Hong Kong Securities and Futures Commission, London licensed by the Financial Services Authority and Dubai licensed by the Dubai Financial Services Authority. The company also has a Foreign Institutional Investor (FII) license from the Securities and Exchange Board of India. It has a permanent capital base of US$70 million.

A recent article on Samena Capital in Business Times (Raffles Conversation) calls Saraf the Silk Road Dealmaker. It quotes him as saying, "We tend to be conservative. We don't tend to do leverage. We don't tend to do shorting or
buying exotic derivatives. We do the simple thing. We buy into a good company and hold it for three to five years before selling it," he says. "We are partners. We help companies grow their business in a different market -
for example, if an Indian company wants to go into the Middle East."

An article by Asian Venture Capital Journal says, " Operating partners now form the backbone of most private equity firms, in a variety of different guises. Samena Capital's take on this concept recognizes the importance of
relationships."

History and overview
Samena Capital was set up in 2008 to take advantage of the cross-border investment opportunities arising out of the dislocation in global financial markets, and the emergence of the Asian, Indian and Middle Eastern countries as the growth markets of the future, even as the developed countries of Europe and the USA are receding into a recession.

Samena Capital's main business lines include asset management (through special situations investments, credit market opportunities and direct investments/projects) and hedge fund seeding. Through its special situations funds, it invests in companies that have the ability to go across markets (within the SAMENA region) and capitalise on cross border opportunities. The Samena Special Situations Funds apply a hybrid private equity structure to public equity investing, growth equity/platform investments, pre-IPOs and buy-out opportunities. No leverage is used in these investments.

In 2010, Samena Capital began investing in the rapidly evolving credit markets in the SAMENA countries. At present, Samena Capital’s credit platform consists of the Samena India Credit Fund, which was launched in November 2013 and invests in Indian high yield corporate credit and structured credit opportunities.

In 2011, Geneva-based banking group Reyl & Cie entered into a joint venture with Samena Capital via its seeding arm, Samena Asia Managers (SAM). The joint venture aims to combine Reyl and Cie's asset management and distribution expertise in Europe with Samena Capital's product expertise and network of people in the Asian, Indian and Middle East markets. The venture has been profitable since its inception.

Samena's assets under management have grown significantly over the last nine years to over US1 billion.

Key people
Shirish Saraf is the Founder and Vice Chairman of Samena Capital. In June 2014 he led the acquisition of a significant stake in RAK Ceramics PSC, a company listed on the Abu Dhabi Securities Exchange and one of the world’s largest ceramics manufacturers with annual revenues of approximately US$1 billion.[3] In February 2014, Saraf closed another landmark deal, whereby India’s Mahindra Two Wheelers (part of the US$16.7 billion Mahindra Group) and Kinetic Engineering sold the equity stake in Mahindra Two Wheelers Limited to Samena Capital.[4] Prior to Samena, he was a co-founder and managing director of Abraaj Capital, one of the largest emerging markets-focused, global private equity firms with over US$6 billion in assets under management. Prior to Abraaj, his career spanned across ANZ Investment Bank, Taib Bank  and Oriel Investment Company. He has held various directorships, including at Aramex Holdings, Memo Express, DCM-Hyundai (India) Limited, Commercial Bank of Oman SAOG, EFG Hermes, Amwal Capital (Qatar), Abraaj Capital and BMA Capital Management. In September 2013, AsianInvestor listed Mr Saraf as one of Asia’s 25 most influential people in Private Equity.

V-Nee YEH is the Non-Executive Chairman of Samena Capital. V-Nee is a former member of the Executive Council of the Government of the Hong Kong Special Administrative Region (January 2009 to June 2012), the co-founder and honorary chairman of Value Partners Group, and a board member of the Columbia University Endowment. Known as an "astute investor and entrepreneur".

Other shareholders of Samena Capital come from a cross-section of geographies and industries, with interests ranging from oil and gas sector, to banking and insurance, engineering and construction, education, and finance and asset management sector.

They include: Sheikh Nahayan Bin Mubarak Al Nahayan, minister of culture, youth and community development, UAE; Samir Fancy, chairman and founder of Oman’s oil and gas giant Renaissance Services SAOG; Sheikh Nawaf Nasser Bin Khaled Al Thani (belonging to the House of Thani), chairman and CEO of Qatar’s Nasser Bin Khaled Holding; Ziad Al-Turki, Vice Chairman of ATCO Group, one of Saudi Arabia’s premier family groups; Kamal Bahamdan, co-founder and CEO of Safanad and ex CEO of Bahamdan Group; Gratian Anda, chairman and CEO of IHAG Holding Corp, one of the leading Swiss family owned group of companies; Pansy Ho and Daisy Ho, the CEO and CFO, respectively, of Shun Tak Holdings; Hussain Al Nowais, the Chairman of Al Nowais Investments, a family owned conglomerate business; Maqbool Ali Sultan, former minister of commerce and industry of Oman; Sheikh Mohammed Bin Essa Al-Khalifa, senior political advisor to the Crown Prince of Bahrain; Sheikh Ahmed Al Thani, director of Nasser Bin Faleh Al Thani Group and former minister of communications and transport of Qatar; Sheikh Sultan bin Saleh bin Sultan, President and CEO of Salehiya Establishment, a leading Saudi Arabian pharmaceutical and medical equipment distributor; Sheikh Sultan bin Saqr Al Qassimi, managing director and co-founder of GIBCA, a highly respected industrial, manufacturing, construction, investment and real estate development group in the United Arab Emirates; Mishal Al Ardi, CEO of Al-Shuwayer Group of companies, a leading family owned business group in Saudi Arabia; Mohammed Al Barwani, founder and chairman of MB Holding in Oman; the Capricorn Investment Group; Richard Elman, executive chairman and founder of Hong Kong’s Noble Group business; Rana Talwar, managing partner and founding chairman of Sabre Capital; Shyam Sunder Bhartia and Hari Bhartia, chairman and co-chairman of Indian pharmaceutical giant, Jubilant Life Sciences; Ramiz Hasan, founder of Japan-focused hedge fund Invicta; and Simon Wong, one of the co-founders of GC Capital)[31].

Investment team
The Samena's investment team comprises portfolio managers and executives with experience across regions, including Pan Asia, Greater China, Japan, Korea, South Asia, MENA, India and Europe. Besides V-Nee YEH and Shirish Saraf, it includes members such as:

Ramiz Hasan, founder of Japan-focused hedge fund Invicta and a founding shareholder of Samena Capital.

Vincent Chan, Senior Managing Director and Head of Asia.

Main activities
Samena's primary business is asset management, covering special situations, credit markets and hedge fund seeding/bespoke products:

Special situations
The flagship Samena Special Situations Fund (SSSF I) was launched in August 2008, raising almost US$180 million amidst what was one of the most challenging capital raising environments in history. The five-year closed ended fund with a private equity structure, seeks opportunities in listed companies in the SAMENA region that have stable mature businesses with a strong management and technical knowhow, enabling them to take advantage of cross border opportunities.

The fund is reported to have fully exited twelve and partially exited two out of the 18 investments it has made so far. It is also understood to have repaid 70% of its capital to investors by June 2014. Some of the most profitable investments the fund made were in Eicher Motors and Voltamp Transformers in India, Rubicon Offshore International, CSE Global in Singapore, Saudi Hollandi Bank in Saudi Arabia, Union National Bank in the UAE and Renaissance Services in Oman.

As a follow up to SSSF I, the company launched Samena Special Situations Fund II, which had a Final Closing in June 2013 of US$340 million. With a seven-year closed-ended structure, this fund has an investment strategy similar to its predecessor, but with an added emphasis on private placement and co-investment opportunities.

The fund's investment strategy is based on a non-leveraged, hybrid investment model, consisting of two distinct portfolios: core investments that form the strategic portfolio, and the more tactical non-core investments that are held for trading or re-sale.

With the growth of its special situations business, Samena is understood to be seeking co-investment opportunities projects and direct investments, which are likely to be of a strategic or pre-IPO nature across a range of industries and geographies.

Credit and Fixed Income markets
At present, Samena Capital’s credit platform consists of the Samena India Credit Fund, which was launched in November 2013 and invests in Indian high yield corporate credit and structured credit opportunities .

Samena Capital established its credit business in February 2010 with the launch of the Samena Asia Credit Fund, a high conviction portfolio of high-yield bonds and other credit investments with a medium-term maturity or investment horizon. It also ran the Samena Credit Opportunities, co-advised with Reyl Asset Management. The Samena Asia Credit Fund has subsequently been closed, with Samena Capital having made a profitable exit from the business.

Hedge fund seeding, managed accounts and bespoke products
To take advantage of the consolidation of the asset management industry during the global financial crisis of 2008, Samena Capital acquired an Asian hedge fund seeding platform from Vision Investment Management in May 2009. The platform has since then been renamed Samena Asia Managers (SAM), and manages the Samena Angel Fund with approximately US$80 million in AUM. The fund provides seed capital to early stage, Asia-focused hedge funds and/or invests in niche hedge funds. Two of the most successful hedge funds it has seeded/accelerated are Chicago-based Phalanx Capital and a Greater China Long/Short Equity Fund. Phalanx Capital won the "Best Multi Strategy Fund" award from AsiaHedge in 2009 and was nominated in this category again in 2010.

In April 2011, Reyl & Cie, one of the leading Swiss banking and asset management groups, decided to partner with Samena Capital in a joint venture that combined SAM's hedge fund seeding business with Reyl and Cie's wealth and asset management expertise. The JV has been profitable since inception.

See also
 Shirish Saraf

References 

Investment companies of the United Arab Emirates
Investment companies of the United Kingdom
Investment companies of Hong Kong